Arun Kumar Mishra (born 3 September 1955) is the current and eighth Chairperson of National Human Rights Commission of India. He is the former Judge of Supreme Court of India. He is former Chief Justice of Calcutta High Court and Rajasthan High Court. He has also served as Acting Chief Justice of Rajasthan High Court. He is also former Judge of Madhya Pradesh High Court.

Early life and education
Mishra was born on 3 September 1955. His father Late Hargovind Mishra was also a judge of the Madhya Pradesh High Court. He completed his graduation in science and obtained a master's degree. He then obtained a degree in law. He practised from 1978 to October 1999 in Constitutional, Civil, Industrial, Criminal and Service Matters in the Bench of High Court of Madhya Pradesh at Gwalior. He worked as part-time Lecturer in Law during 1986 to 1993 and was a Member of Faculty of Law of Jiwaji University, Gwalior from 1991 to 1996.

Memberships

In 1989 and 1995, he was elected Member of State Bar Council of M.P. and Vice-Chairman of State Bar Council of M.P. from 1992 to 1995. He was a member of Academic Council of Government M.L.B. Arts and Commerce Autonomous College, Gwalior from 1996 to 1998.
He was Chairman of Advocates Welfare Committee of Bar Council of India for M.P. from 1996 to 1999.
He was elected Vice-Chairman of Bar Council of India in 1997-1998 and Chairman of the Bar Council from 15 May 1998 to 24 October 1999.
He remained Co-Chairman of All India Meet of Development of Law Course Curriculum consisting of B.C.I., U.G.C., Law Secretaries, Educationalist and Chairman of various State Bar Councils held at Bangalore in 1997.
He was chairman of General Council of National Law School of India University at Bangalore from 15 May 1998 to 24 October 1999.
He remained Member of the various committees of Bar Council of India viz. Legal Education Committee, Rules Making Committee, Welfare Committee, Disciplinary Committee and Trustee of Employees' Provident Fund Committee.

Contributions

He drafted and proposed Foreign Law Degree Recognition Rules of 1997 framed under Advocates' Act, 1961, Bar Council of India Employees' Service Rules, 1996, M.P. Advocates Welfare Scheme, 1995 providing benefit of up to 5 lacs, Rules pertaining to Foreign Lawyers Conditions of Practice Rules on India. He proposed the decision to close evening Law Colleges from July 2000 by B.C.I. for professional purposes i.e. for entry to Bar and drafted All India Lawyers' Welfare Scheme, 1998 and also proposed Amendment to other Welfare Schemes of Advocates.

Elevation to High Court

Justice Arun Mishra was appointed Additional Judge of the High Court of Madhya Pradesh on 25 October 1999 and Permanent Judge on 24 October 2001.
Administrative Judge of M.P. High Court. Remained Chairman, State Legal Service Authority of M.P.
He was transferred to Rajasthan High Court, Jodhpur and took oath on 12 September 2010.
He became Acting Chief Justice of Rajasthan High Court on 1 November 2010.
He took oath of the office of the Chief Justice of Rajasthan on 26 November 2010.

Achievements

Mishra has taken several steps to dovetail technology in functions of Rajasthan High Court. His initiatives include publication of first ever Newsletter of Rajasthan High Court and inauguration of a Museum.

Calcutta High Court
He was appointed the Chief Justice of the Calcutta High Court on 14 December 2012 and served till 2014 and later elevated as the judge of the Supreme Court.

Chairperson of NHRC
On 2 June 2021, he was appointed the Chairperson of the National Human Rights Commission of India. His appointment was criticized by opposition leader Mallikarjun Kharge who requested to appoint a member of the Scheduled Caste or Scheduled Tribe communities arguing that most complaints lodged with NHRC deal with atrocities committed against these communities.

Allegations 
In February 2020, the Supreme Court Bar Association (SCBA) condemned Justice Mishra's statements to praise Prime Minister Narendra Modi. On February 22, 2020, at the inaugural ceremony of the International Judicial Conference, Mishra said, "India is a responsible and most friendly member of the international community under the stewardship of the internationally acclaimed visionary Prime Minister Shri Narendra Modi." He described Modi as "a versatile genius who thinks globally and acts locally".

In response on February 26, 2020, SCBA condemned Mishra's sycophantic remarks for Modi and in a resolution it said such statements reflect poorly on the independence of judiciary which is a basic feature of the Constitution of India. The resolution asserted that if judges show their proximity to politicians, it will influence their judgments in the courts.

On August 31, 2020, a former minister in the Government of India Yashwant Sinha ridiculed Mishra’s slavish behaviour toward Modi. He suggested in a contemptuous tenor that after Mishra’s retirement, Modi should reward him with a job that is more than a Rajya Sabha seat. In October 2021, Sinha criticized Mishra again for his sycophancy for Modi's colleague Amit Shah who is the Home Minister of India.

In an article titled "The Shadow of Haren Pandya's Case Lies Long Over Justice Arun Mishra" published on August 30, 2020, The Wire news site critically analyzed Mishra's judgments.

In an article on April 23, 2020, The Hindu newspaper suggested enacting a law to stop appointments of retired judges by the government in order to restore confidence in the judiciary.

References

External links
 Rajasthan High Court – 
 Calcutta High Court – 

1955 births
Living people
20th-century Indian judges
Judges of the Madhya Pradesh High Court
Judges of the Rajasthan High Court
Chief Justices of the Rajasthan High Court
Chief Justices of the Calcutta High Court
Justices of the Supreme Court of India
21st-century Indian judges
People from Gwalior